Més per Menorca (MpM) is a Menorcan political party. It was a coalition formed by the Socialist Party of Menorca, Republican Left, The Greens of Menorca, Equo, local parties and independents around the island until 2017. MpM was created in July 2014. Until May 2017 it had been linked to the similarly-named alliance in Majorca.

History 
MpM gained 3 deputies in the Balearic elections of 2015, being the third most voted party of the island in those elections (after the PP and the Socialist Party). In the local elections held the same day, the coalition only presented a list in Ciutadella de Menorca, where it gained 6 town councillors and the mayorship. In the remaining municipalities of the island MpM either participated or supported other local coalitions.

In October 2016 the Més per Menorca coalition proposed and carried a motion to adopt permanent Summer Time on the island.

In May 2017, MpM was transformed into a party, electing Nel Martí as its coordinator.

Electoral performance

Parliament of the Balearic Islands

Island Council of Menorca

Cortes Generales

Balearic Islands

 * Within Més
 ** Within Units Podem Més

References

Political parties in the Balearic Islands
Socialist parties in Spain
Nationalist parties in Spain
Left-wing nationalist parties